Khamid Nizamov Alimovch (born August 15, 1987) is an Uzbek professional bodybuilder,  actor and Master of Sports of Uzbekistan in bodybuilding. In 2016, the Bukhara Region Bodybuilding Federation was founded under the leadership of Khamid Nizamov and is the current president.

Biography 
Khamid Nizamov  Alimovch was born on August 15, 1987, in the city of Gijduvan in the Bukhara Region. He started his professional career in bodybuilding in 2010. In 2013, he graduated from Tashkent State University of Economics. His best result as a bodybuilder is 14th place at the WBPF World Championship, 1st place at the Central Asian and Kazakhstan Championships, 1st place twice in the Uzbekistan Open Championship. The athlete is married and has 4 children.

List of competitions

Filmography 

 2019 Sniper — Azamat

 2020  Ishq o'yinlari — Said
 2022  Yur Muhabbat — Hamza

See also
List of male professional bodybuilders
List of female professional bodybuilders

References

External links

 Khamid Nizamov Official Instagram page

1987 births
Living people
Uzbekistani bodybuilders
Male bodybuilders
People associated with physical culture
Professional bodybuilders
People from Bukhara Region